is a hypothetical  civil war in Japanese history. It is based on the assumption that the death of Emperor Keitai in the first half of the 6th century and the subsequent struggle over the succession to the throne occurred because there are unnatural points in the documents recording the history of the time. The year of the outbreak is specifically set as the year of Emperor Keitai's death in the Common Era 531, the year in which Emperor Keitai is said to have died in the Chronicles of Japan, and some call it the Shinigai no Hen (辛亥の変'').

Outline 
According to the Nihon Shoki (Chronicles of Japan), the year of Emperor Tsugitai's death is dated to the year of the Boar (531), based on the theory of the Baekje Hongi, while another theory places the death in the year of the Tiger (534). The year of the first tiger is considered to be the year of the accession of the next emperor, Ankan, which is usually interpreted as a two-year vacancy after the death of Emperor Tsugitai.

However, several questions emerge here.

 The article on the year of the Xinhai in the "Baekje Hongi" states, "The Japanese emperor, his son, and his son-in-law all collapsed.」
 In the Jōgū Shōtoku Hōōō Teisetsu and the Genkōji Garan Engi, the year of Emperor Kinmei's accession is set to the year 531, as if he had been the next Emperor Kinmei after Emperor Tsugitai.
 In the Kojiki, Emperor Tsugitai is said to have died in the year 527.

The method of interpreting these discrepancies has been the subject of debate since the kinochronological theory gained attention in the Meiji Period.

The first theory to emerge was that Emperor Tsugitai died in 527 and Emperor Kinmei ascended to the throne in 531, with the reign of Emperor Ankan and Emperor Senka assumed in the intervening four years. This theory is inconsistent with the fact that both the Kojiki and Nihonshoki record the death of Emperor Ankan in the year 535 (the year of Otou) (of course, there is room for debate as to whether this is an accurate date based on historical sources or an error in the same source).

In Showa Era, Kida Sadakichi's "Baekje Honki" indicates that a serious political crisis occurred in the year 531, and as a result, after the death of Emperor Tsugitai, the Ankan-Senka line, whose mother was Owari Mezako Ehime from a local powerful familyand Emperor Ninken, whose mother was Princess Tebiraka, the daughter of Emperor NinkenIn the late 19th century, he presented the idea that the Yamato dynasty was divided into two separate dynasties in the Yamato Dynasty. This idea was taken one step further by Hayashiya Tatsusaburo after World War II, who proposed that confusion over conflicts over the Korean Peninsula situation (such as the Iwai Rebellion) occurred at the end of the reign of Emperor Tsugitai, and that after his death, "two parallel dynasties" and the resulting nationwide civil war occurred. The Nihon Shoki (Chronicles of Japan) conceals this fact. In order to conceal this fact, the Nihon-shoki (Chronicles of Japan) is said to have written as if half-brothers had ascended to the throne in the order of their ages.

However, the "Baekje Hongi" is not extant, and it is difficult to verify its statements. Furthermore, since the "Baekje Hongi" is a history of Baekje, some have questioned the reliability of the articles related to Waekoku (Japan). Even if it is true that an emperor collapsed in the year Xinhai, it is not clear to whom this refers (if the year of Emperor Ankan's collapse is mistaken, it is possible that Emperor Seonhwa collapsed in the year Xinhai and Emperor Kinmei came to the throne). Therefore, there was no "juxtaposition of two dynasties" or civil war, and some scholars believe that the succession to the imperial throne during this period should be based on the account in the Nihon shoki (Chronicles of Japan) that states that after the demise of the successor to the throne, his successors (Ankan and Senka) collapsed within a short period (several years), resulting in the succession from the successor to Ankan, to Senka, to Kinmyo. The "Nihon Shoki" is also influential in this regard. Furthermore, even among scholars who support the "two dynasties in parallel," Hayashiya's theory is not always fully supported. For example, Hayashiya interprets that behind Emperor Kinmei was the Soga clan, which was married to the emperor, and behind Emperors Ankan and Senka was the Otomo clan, which declined during this period. However, there are also theories that see the background as opposing, such as the conflict between the local powerful tribes that supported Emperor Tsugitai and his successor and the Yamato powerful tribes that sought to regain power by supporting Emperor Kinmei, who was descended from the previous imperial lineage.The other theory is that it was a conflict between two powerful tribes, one with the surname of "vassal" and the other with the surname of "ren".

The period from Emperor Tsugitai's reign to Emperor Kinmei's is said to have been marked by a series of significant events that would later shape the history of Japan, including the official transmission of Buddhism, the establishment of tun storehouses, the compilation of the Teiki and Old Japanese epitaph, the introduction of Japanese epithet, and the Musashikokuzo Rebellion. It is believed that the existence or non-existence of "two parallel dynasties" and the occurrence of civil wars had no small influence on the interpretation of these events.

References

Bibliography 

 直木孝次郎「継体・欽明朝の内乱」『国史大辞典 5』（吉川弘文館 1985年） ISBN 978-4-642-00505-0
 川口勝康「継体・欽明朝の内乱」『日本史大事典 2』（平凡社 1993年） ISBN 978-4-582-13102-4
 大平聡「継体・欽明朝の内乱」『日本歴史大事典 1』（小学館 2000年） ISBN 978-4-09-523001-6
Kofun period
Hypotheses
Pages with unreviewed translations